Mane de la Parra, also known as Mane, (born Manuel de la Parra Borja; December 23, 1982 in Mexico City, Mexico) is a Mexican singer and actor.

Biography 
De la Parra is the grandson of Mexican writer Yolanda Vargas Dulché. He studied at Berklee College of Music in Boston. He further took classes in flamenco guitar in Barcelona with Manuel Granados.

Music career 
Mane is now collaborating with a number of people who are  supporting his first solo album. Others involved in this album were : Zurdo Alegibe and Freddy Valeriani.

Songs 
 Estar Sin Ti {eng. Being without you}, song, Soundtrack Verano de Amor
 Quiero que sepas {eng. I want you to know}, song, Soundtrack Verano de Amor
 Quisiera {eng. I wish}, song, Soundtrack Verano de Amor
 No vaya a ser {eng. It won't be}, song, Soundtrack Verano de Amor
 No puedes ser real {eng. You can't be real}, song, Soundtrack Verano de Amor
 Estrella mia {eng. My star}, song, Soundtrack Verano de Amor
 Es Mentira  (eng. It's a lie) 
 La Formula {eng. The Formula}
 Siente {eng. I Feel}
 No vas a olvidar {eng. You won't forget}
 Hoy voy a amarte {eng. I'm going to love you today}
 Yo solo quiero saber {eng. I only want to know}
 Esperanza del corazon {eng. Hope of the Heart}, song, Soundtrack Esperanza del Corazon
 Mi respiracion {eng. My Breath}, song, Soundtrack Esperanza del Corazon
Te tuve y te perdi
Como soy
 "Es una locura"(featuring. Emilio Osorio), song, Soundtrack ¿Qué le pasa a mi familia?

Filmography

Film

Television

Awards and nominations

TVyNovelas Awards

External links 
Official MySpace

1982 births
Living people
Mexican male telenovela actors
Mexican male film actors
Male actors from Mexico City
Singers from Mexico City
21st-century Mexican male actors
Berklee College of Music alumni
21st-century Mexican singers
21st-century Mexican male singers